Mungo Wentworth MacCallum (21 December 1941 – 9 December 2020) was an Australian political journalist and commentator.

MacCallum was once described by Gough Whitlam as a "tall, bearded descendant of lunatic aristocrats". His father, Mungo Ballardie MacCallum (1913–1999), was a journalist and pioneer of television in Australia, and his great-grandfather, Sir Mungo MacCallum (1854-1942), had been a prominent scholar and university administrator. Mungo MacCallum. His mother, Diana Wentworth, was a great-granddaughter of the Australian explorer and politician William Charles Wentworth (1790–1872). Her brother, William Charles Wentworth IV (1907–2003), was a Liberal member for the Division of Mackellar in the House of Representatives, where he was a vociferous exponent of anti-communism, and of distinctive views on many other issues.

Early life

MacCallum was born in Sydney and educated at the elite Cranbrook School, a short walk from where he lived with his parents next door to his grandmother's house in Wentworth Street, Point Piper. After leaving school, he went to the University of Sydney, where he obtained a BA with third-class honours.

Writing career

MacCallum was known for his strongly centre-left, pro-Australian Labor Party views, being critical both of the conservative Liberal and National Parties, and of the far left (e.g., communists) who attacked Labor for its cautious reformism. From the 1970s to the 1990s he covered Australian federal politics from the Canberra Press Gallery for The Australian, The National Times, The Sydney Morning Herald, Nation Review and radio stations 2JJ / Triple J and 2SER.

During the 1980s he moved to Ocean Shores, on the north coast of New South Wales. He continued to write political commentary, notably for the Australian Broadcasting Corporation (ABC) current affairs and news analysis program The Drum, and for the magazine The Monthly. He appeared on Australia's national Community Radio Network; and contributed columns for the Byron Shire Echo and The Northern Star, and cryptic crosswords for The Saturday Paper.
 
He was the author of several books, including Run, Johnny, Run, written after the 2004 Australian federal election. His autobiographical narrative of the Australian political scene, Mungo: the man who laughs, has been reprinted four times. How To Be A Megalomaniac or, Advice to a Young Politician was published in 2002, and Political Anecdotes was published in 2003. In December 2004, Duffy & Snellgrove published War and Pieces: John Howard's last election.

On 8 September 2014 a minor sensation was caused when a  false report of his death was placed in a tweet on the social media site Twitter. The matter was clarified within the hour but, within the same hour a trending hashtag #mungolives had sprung up on the same site.

On 2 December 2020, MacCallum announced on the website "Pearls and Irritations" that, due to deteriorating health, he was finishing his journalistic career. He was suffering from throat cancer, prostate cancer, and heart disease, and he died on 9 December 2020, aged 78.

References

Further reading
 Pratt, Mel (1973) Interview with Mungo Wentworth MacCallum, Federal political correspondent Mel Pratt collection at the National Library of Australia

Bibliography
 Punch and Judy: The Double Disillusion Election Of 2010 Penguin Books 
 Australian Story: Kevin Rudd and the Lucky Country, Quarterly Essay 36 December 2009, 
 Poll Dancing, December 2007, Black Inc. books
 Evolution Baby, October 2005, The Monthly 6
 The Vanishing. It wasn't the time, but he was the leader Labor had to have, May 2005, The Monthly 4
 From Nation To Now, May 2005, The Monthly 1
 Girt By Sea: Australia, the Refugees and the Politics of Fear, March 2002, Quarterly Essay 5 
 The Saturday Paper  Contributors: Mungo MacCallum

External links
 The Monthly. Articles by Mungo MacCallum for The Monthly
 In Conversation: Mungo MacCallum and Shane Maloney discuss the fall of John Howard and Mungo's account of the campaign, Poll Dancing published by Black Inc.

1941 births
2020 deaths
Australian Book Review people
Australian political journalists
University of Sydney alumni
People educated at Cranbrook School, Sydney